Lydia Marie Edwards (born 1981) is an American attorney and politician. She served as a member of the Boston City Council from the 1st district from 2018 to 2022  and has served as a member of the Massachusetts Senate from the 1st Suffolk and Middlesex district since 2022. She resigned from the Boston City Council at the end of April 2022.

Early life and education
She and her twin sister were raised by their mother who served in the United States Air Force. Edwards earned a Bachelor of Arts degree from Fordham University, a Juris Doctor from the Washington College of Law, and a Master of Laws in taxation from Boston University School of Law.

Career 
Edwards has worked as a public interest attorney with Greater Boston Legal Services and served as the deputy director within the Mayor's Office of Housing Stability.

Edwards was elected to the Boston City Council in November 2017 and assumed office in January 2018. She represents the North End, East Boston, and Charlestown. Edwards was a Democratic candidate in the 2016 special election for the First Suffolk & Middlesex District of the Massachusetts State Senate. She ran for the State Senate again in 2022. She won the Democratic primary on December 15, 2021, defeating Revere School Committee member Anthony D'Ambrosio by a 60%–40% margin. Edwards is the first woman and person of color to represent the senate district. https://www.wbur.org/news/2022/01/14/lydia-edwards-massachusetts-senate-special-election

As a Boston City Councilor, in 2021, Edwards led the effort to amend the City Charter provision relating to city budgets. An ordinance for the city to hold a binding referendum on amending the city charter during its November 2021 municipal elections was passed by the city council. The amendment's changes included giving the City Council the power to line-item veto some of the items in a budget put forth by the mayor, amend a mayor's proposed budget both in whole and in part, and the ability to override a mayoral veto of a budget by a two-third's vote. These changes provide the City Council with more powering the creation of a budget. Another change in the amendment was creating an Office of Participatory Budgeting, giving the city's residents more power in the creation of city budgets.  In June 2021, Acting Mayor Kim Janey signed the ordinance. Weeks later, State Attorney General Maura Healey cleared the referendum for inclusion on the ballot. The referendum saw the amendment approved by voters, thereby amending the city charter.

Election results

2019

2017

{| class=wikitable
!colspan=1 rowspan=2 |Candidates
!colspan=2 |Preliminary Election
!colspan=2 |General Election
|-
!Votes
!%
!Votes
!%
|- 
| Lydia Edwards
| align="right" | 3,547
| align="right" | 45.95%
| align="right" | 6,906
| align="right" | 52.70%
|- 
| Stephen Passacantilli
| align="right" | 3,628
| align="right" | 47.00%
| align="right" | 6,182
| align="right" | 47.17%
|- 
| Margaret Farmer
| align="right" | 522
| align="right" | 6.76%
| colspan=2 bgcolor=darkgray |
|- 
| Write-in
| align="right" | 22
| align="right" | 0.29%
| align="right" | 17
| align="right" | 0.13%
|-
| Total
| align="right" | 7,719
| align="right" | 100
| align="right" | 13,105
| align="right" | 100

References

1981 births
Boston City Council members
Massachusetts lawyers
Washington College of Law alumni
Boston University School of Law alumni
Living people
Fordham University alumni
Women city councillors in Massachusetts
21st-century American politicians
21st-century American women politicians